Gunnar Olsson (27 March 1901 – 4 May 1960) was a Swedish footballer. He played in ten matches for the Sweden national football team from 1923 to 1932. He was also part of Sweden's squad for the football tournament at the 1924 Summer Olympics, but he did not play in any matches.

References

External links
 

1901 births
1960 deaths
Swedish footballers
Sweden international footballers
Place of birth missing
Association football forwards